Edgar Bond (born 25 November 1935) is a Filipino former sports shooter. He competed in the 50 metre pistol event at the 1964 Summer Olympics. He also competed at the 1966 Asian Games and won a silver medal.

References

External links
 

1935 births
Living people
Filipino male sport shooters
Olympic shooters of the Philippines
Shooters at the 1964 Summer Olympics
Place of birth missing (living people)
Asian Games medalists in shooting
Shooters at the 1966 Asian Games
Asian Games silver medalists for the Philippines
Asian Games bronze medalists for the Philippines
Medalists at the 1966 Asian Games